Dawida may refer to:

Dawida language
Michael Dawida
Callulina dawida, a sp. of frog